Mark Knowles and Daniel Nestor were the defending champions but lost in the semifinals to James Blake and Mardy Fish.

Blake and Fish won in the final 6–3, 6–4 against Rick Leach and Brian MacPhie.

Seeds
Champion seeds are indicated in bold text while text in italics indicates the round in which those seeds were eliminated.

  Bob Bryan /  Mike Bryan (first round)
  Mark Knowles /  Daniel Nestor (semifinals)
  Rick Leach /  Brian MacPhie (final)
  Jordan Kerr /  Tom Vanhoudt (first round)

Draw

References
 2004 U.S. Men's Clay Court Championships Doubles Draw

U.S. Men's Clay Court Championships
2004 U.S. Men's Clay Court Championships